1,2-Dibromoethane, also known as ethylene dibromide (EDB), is an organobromine compound with the chemical formula . Although trace amounts occur naturally in the ocean, where it is formed probably by algae and kelp, it is mainly synthetic. It is a dense colorless liquid with a faint, sweet odor, detectable at 10 ppm, and is a widely used and sometimes-controversial fumigant. The combustion of 1,2-dibromoethane produces hydrogen bromide gas that is significantly corrosive.

Preparation and use
It is produced by the reaction of ethylene gas with bromine, in a classic halogen addition reaction:
CH=CH + Br → BrCH–CHBr

Historically, 1,2-dibromoethane was used as a component in anti-knock additives in leaded fuels.  It reacts with lead residues to generate volatile lead bromides, thereby preventing fouling of the engine with lead deposits.

Pesticide
It has been used as a pesticide in soil and on various crops.  The applications were initiated after the forced retirement of 1,2-dibromo-3-chloropropane (DBCP). Most of these uses have been stopped in the U.S.  It continues to be used as a fumigant for treatment of logs for termites and beetles, for control of moths in beehives.

Reagent
1,2-Dibromoethane has wider applications in the preparation of other organic compounds including those carrying modified diazocine rings and vinyl bromide that is a precursor to some fire retardants.

In organic synthesis, 1,2-dibromoethane is used as a source of bromine to brominate carbanions and to activate magnesium for certain Grignard reagents. In the latter process, 1,2-dibromoethane reacts with magnesium, producing ethene and magnesium bromide, and exposes a freshly etched portion of magnesium to the substrate.

Health effects
1,2-Dibromoethane causes changes in the metabolism and severe destruction of living tissues. The known empirical LD50 values for 1,2-dibromoethane are 140 mg kg−1 (oral, rat), and 300.0 mg kg−1 (dermal, rabbit). 1,2-Dibromoethane is a known carcinogen, with pre-1977 exposure levels ranking it as the most carcinogenic substance on the HERP Index.

The effects on people of breathing high levels are not known, but animal studies with short-term exposures to high levels caused depression and collapse, indicating effects on the brain. Changes in the brain and behavior were also seen in young rats whose male parents had breathed 1,2-dibromoethane, and birth defects were observed in the young of animals that were exposed while pregnant. 1,2-Dibromoethane is not known to cause birth defects in humans. Swallowing has caused death at 40ml doses.

References

External links
 National Pollutant Inventory 1,2-Dibromoethane Fact Sheet
 Congressional Research Service (CRS) Reports regarding Ethylene Dibromide
 ATSDR ToxFAQs
 CDC – NIOSH Pocket Guide to Chemical Hazards

Endocrine disruptors
Insecticides
Bromoalkanes
Fumigants
Flame retardants
Hazardous air pollutants
Fuel additives
IARC Group 2A carcinogens
Sweet-smelling chemicals